Newchapel may refer to:

 Newchapel, Staffordshire, a village in the Borough of Newcastle-under-Lyme, Staffordshire, England
 Newchapel (ward), a ward in the Borough of Newcastle-under-Lyme
 Newchapel, Surrey, a village near East Grinstead, England
 Newchapel, County Tipperary, a civil parish in Ballytarsna, Clonmel, County Tipperary, Ireland
 Newchapel, Pembrokeshire, a hamlet in the community of Manordeifi, Pembrokeshire, Wales
 Newchapel, Powys, a location in the UK in Powys, Wales